Panopoda is a genus of moths in the family Erebidae. The genus was erected by Achille Guenée in 1852.

Species
 Panopoda carneicosta Guenée, 1852 – brown panopoda moth
 Panopoda repanda Walker, 1858 – orange panopoda moth
 Panopoda rigida J. B. Smith, 1903
 Panopoda rufimargo Hübner, 1818 – red-lined panopoda moth

References

Eulepidotinae
Moth genera